Atithi Devo Bhava is a 2022 Indian Telugu-language romantic action film directed by debutant Polimera Nageshawar and produced by Srinivasa Cine Creations. The film stars Aadi Saikumar and Nuveksha with music composed by Shekar Chandra. The plot follows Abhay who has monophobia and his life takes a dramatic turn after meets his love interest. The film is released theatrically on 7 January 2022.

Plot

Abhi suffers from a problem called Mono Phobia. Because of this, he cannot survive alone and always expects someone to be on his side. In this process, he falls in love with Vaishnavi. When everything seems to be going fine, Abhi's phobia creates new misunderstandings in his love story.

Cast 
 Aadi Saikumar as Abhay "Abhi" Ram 
 Nuveksha as Vaishnavi
 Aadarsh Balakrishna
 Rohini as Abhi's mother
 Raghu Karumanchi
 Ravi Prakash
 Naveena Reddy
 Saptagiri

Production and release 
The film marks the directorial debut of Polimera Nageshawar. Filming primarily took place around Hyderabad while the songs were shot in Darjeeling. Shekar Chandra composed the music while Karthika Srinivas and Amarnath Reddy performed the editing and cinematography respectively. Atithi Devo Bhava was released on 7 January 2022 ahead of the festival of Sankranti, following the postponement of major Telugu productions like RRR and Radhe Shyam.

Soundtrack
The soundtrack album consists of four singles composed by Shekar Chandra, and released by Sony Music South.

Reception 
A reviewer from The Hans India rated the film 1.5 stars of 5 and wrote, "Atithi Devo Bhava is a regular and outdated romantic family entertainer that lacks impactful narration and convincing screenplay. Though the lead actors gave a decent performance, the film struggles with loopholes like uneven narration and outdated treatment." Anji Shetty of Sakshi, who also rated the same, opined that the director had failed in execution despite having a novel idea.

A reviewer from Eenadu appreciated the storyline and score but criticized the screenplay. Surya Prakash of Asianet News  felt the film lacked a thriller element which could keep the audience hooked to the story while the comedy and action sequences where poorly handled.

References

External links 

 

2020s Telugu-language films
Indian romantic action films
2020s romantic action films
Films about mental disorders
Films set in Hyderabad, India
Films shot in Hyderabad, India
Films shot in Darjeeling
2022 directorial debut films
2022 romance films
2022 action films